Winnsboro may refer to a place in the United States:

Winnsboro, Louisiana, a city in Franklin Parish
Winnsboro, South Carolina, a town in Fairfield County
Winnsboro Mills, South Carolina, a census-designated place in Fairfield County
Winnsboro, Texas, a city in Franklin and Wood counties